Protein CBFA2T2 is a protein that in humans is encoded by the CBFA2T2 gene.

Function 

In acute myeloid leukemia, especially in the M2 subtype, the t(8;21)(q22;q22) translocation is one of the most frequent karyotypic abnormalities. The translocation produces a chimeric gene made up of the 5'-region of the RUNX1 (AML1) gene fused to the 3'-region of the CBFA2T1 (MTG8) gene. The chimeric protein is thought to associate with the nuclear corepressor/histone deacetylase complex to block hematopoietic differentiation. The protein encoded by this gene binds to the AML1-MTG8 complex and may be important in promoting leukemogenesis. Several transcript variants are thought to exist for this gene, but the full-length natures of only three have been described.

Interactions 

CBFA2T2 has been shown to interact with RUNX1T1.

References

Further reading

External links 
 
 

Transcription factors